Philip O'Reilly may refer to:
 Philip O'Reilly (Cavan County MP)  (1599–1655), member of parliament for County Cavan, and leading member of the 1641 Rebellion
 Philip Og O'Reilly (c. 1640–1703), member of parliament for Cavan Borough
 Philip Leo O'Reilly, Irish bishop 
 Philip O'Reilly (rugby union) Japanese rugby union player

See also
 Philip Reilly, American fencer